Home Is Where the Heart Is is the tenth studio album by American singer-songwriter Bobby Womack. The album was released in 1976, by Columbia Records.

Track listing

Personnel
Bobby Womack - lead and rhythm guitar, vocals
Charles Fullilove - lead guitar
Jimmy Johnson - rhythm guitar
Eddie Hinton - acoustic guitar on "A Little Bit Salty"
Wayne Perkins - lead guitar on "One More Chance On Love" and "We've Only Just Begun"
David Hood - bass
Barry Beckett - keyboards
Sonny Burke - keyboards on "One More Chance On Love"
Roger Hawkins - drums, percussion
Tom Roady - percussion
Dashilell Humdy, Harvey Thompson - tenor saxophone
Ronald Eades - baritone saxophone
Alan Deville, Ben Culley, Harrison Calloway, Lester Smith - trumpet
Dale Quillen, Zaimos Rowan - trombone
Bruce Sundano, Cassietta George, Cecil Womack, Curtis Womack, Eddie Hokensen, Edwiges Gonzales, Friendly Womack, Jr., Joe Esposito, Josephine Howard, Peggy Young, The Valentinos - backing vocals
Technical
Carrot Faye, Gregg Hamm, Roger Dollarhide, Steve Melton, Bob "Inky" Incorvaia, Jerry Masters - engineer
Kenneth McGowan - photography

References

1976 albums
Bobby Womack albums
Columbia Records albums